The Philippines participated in the 1962 Asian Games held in Jakarta, Indonesia from August 24 to September 4, 1962. Ranked 3rd with 7 gold medals, 4 silver medals and 16 bronze medals with a total of 27 over-all medals.

Asian Games performance
Mona Sulaiman copped three gold medals when she topped the 100 and 200-meter dash and anchored the national squad in the women's 4x100-meter finals. Philippine boxing won their first gold medal when Filipino welterweight boxer Manfredo Alipala, a 24-year old National Open champion from Far Eastern University, outpunched Japan's Kichijiro Hamada in the finals.

The Philippine basketball team captured its fourth championship in the Asian Games competitions. In tennis, Johnny Jose bagged the Asiad men's tennis singles gold medal.

Medalists

Gold

Silver

Bronze

Multiple

Medal summary

Medals by sports

References

Nations at the 1962 Asian Games
1962
Asian Games